Jeremy James Bruhl (born 1956) is an Australian botanist. He is an emeritus professor in the School of Environmental and Rural Science at the University of New England and director of the N.C.W. Beadle Herbarium which holds c.110,000 plant specimens.

He has written on many species, in particular, on the genera  Phyllanthus, Sauropus  and Walwhalleya,  and also extensively on the family Cyperaceae (see below).

Some publications 
 2000.  Multiple evolutionary origins of C4 photosynthesis in the Cyperaceae : 629-636. In: K.L. Wilson & D.A. Morrison (eds.) Monocots: Systematics and Evolution. CSIRO Publ. Collinwood. Australia
 1990.  Cypsela Anatomy in the 'Cotuleae' (Asteraceae-Anthemideae) . With Christopher J. Quinn. Ed. Academic Press, 23 pp.
 1987. (with Whalley R.D.B.) Systematic studies in Paniceae (Poaceae): Homopholis and Whalleya, The Australian Paniceae (Poaceae) 96, Australian Systematic Botany 13 (3): 437-468
2011. (with  Whalley, R.D.B.) Walwhalleya jacobsiana (Poaceae, Paniceae), a new, rare species of grass from South Australia. Telopea 13, 77-92.
2007. (with Wilson, K.L.) 
2006. (with  Wilson, P.G., Wills, K.E.) Grass not fungus: Walwhalleya nom. nov. (Poaceae, Paniceae). Australian Systematic Botany 19, 327-328.
1997. (with Hunter, J.T.) New Sauropus (Euphorbiaceae: Phyllantheae) taxa for the Northern Territory and Western Australia and notes on other Sauropus occurring in these regions. Nuytsia 11, 165-184.
1997. (with Hunter, J.T.) Two new species of Phyllanthus and notes on Phyllanthus and Sauropus (Euphorbiaceae: Phyllantheae) in New South Wales. Telopea 7, 149-165.
2008. (with Pruesapan, K., Telford, I.R.H., Draisma, S.G.A., Van Welzen, P.C.) Delimitation of Sauropus (Phyllanthaceae) Based on Plastid matK and Nuclear Ribosomal ITS DNA Sequence Data. Annals of Botany 102, 1007-1018.
2015. (with Rye, B.L., Barrett, R.L., Barrett, M.D., Clarke, K.L., Wilson, K.L.) Five new species and a new combination in Cyperaceae from the Kimberley region of Western Australia. Nuytsia 26, 167-184.
2017. (with Telford, I.R.)  Three new species segregated from Phebalium squamulosum (Rutaceae) based on morphological and phytochemical data. Telopea in preparation,
2004. (with Xiufu, Z., Wilson, K.L.) Sympodial Structure of Spikelets in the Tribe Schoeneae (Cyperaceae). American Journal of Botany 91, 24-36.

References

External links 

1956 births
Living people
Academic staff of the University of New England (Australia)
Australian Botanical Liaison Officers